This is a list of countries by titanium sponge production based on USGS figures. The production figures are for titanium sponge, units are in metric tons.

References

Titanium
Production